The Almetyevsk constituency (No. 30) is a Russian legislative constituency in Tatarstan. The constituency covered most of southern Tatarstan until 2003, but after the 2015 redistricting it was relocated to southeastern Tatarstan as its rural districts were placed into Nizhnekamsk constituency.

Members elected

Election results

1994

|-
! colspan=2 style="background-color:#E9E9E9;text-align:left;vertical-align:top;" |Candidate
! style="background-color:#E9E9E9;text-align:left;vertical-align:top;" |Party
! style="background-color:#E9E9E9;text-align:right;" |Votes
! style="background-color:#E9E9E9;text-align:right;" |%
|-
|style="background-color:"|
|align=left|Gennady Yegorov
|align=left|Independent
|-
|73.9%
|-
| colspan="5" style="background-color:#E9E9E9;"|
|- style="font-weight:bold"
| colspan="4" |Source:
|
|}

1995

|-
! colspan=2 style="background-color:#E9E9E9;text-align:left;vertical-align:top;" |Candidate
! style="background-color:#E9E9E9;text-align:left;vertical-align:top;" |Party
! style="background-color:#E9E9E9;text-align:right;" |Votes
! style="background-color:#E9E9E9;text-align:right;" |%
|-
|style="background-color:"|
|align=left|Azat Khamayev
|align=left|Agrarian Party
|
|51.42%
|-
|style="background-color:"|
|align=left|Valery Luzgin
|align=left|Communist Party
|
|35.05%
|-
|style="background-color:#000000"|
|colspan=2 |against all
|
|9.58%
|-
| colspan="5" style="background-color:#E9E9E9;"|
|- style="font-weight:bold"
| colspan="3" style="text-align:left;" | Total
| 
| 100%
|-
| colspan="5" style="background-color:#E9E9E9;"|
|- style="font-weight:bold"
| colspan="4" |Source:
|
|}

1999

|-
! colspan=2 style="background-color:#E9E9E9;text-align:left;vertical-align:top;" |Candidate
! style="background-color:#E9E9E9;text-align:left;vertical-align:top;" |Party
! style="background-color:#E9E9E9;text-align:right;" |Votes
! style="background-color:#E9E9E9;text-align:right;" |%
|-
|style="background-color:#3B9EDF"|
|align=left|Fandas Safiullin
|align=left|Fatherland – All Russia
|
|55.47%
|-
|style="background-color:"|
|align=left|Ilgiz Gimatov
|align=left|Independent
|
|12.86%
|-
|style="background-color:"|
|align=left|Mansur Galiyev
|align=left|Communist Party
|
|11.78%
|-
|style="background-color:"|
|align=left|Anas Nurutdinov
|align=left|Independent
|
|4.82%
|-
|style="background-color:"|
|align=left|Sayetgali Abkadyrov
|align=left|Independent
|
|2.17%
|-
|style="background-color:#000000"|
|colspan=2 |against all
|
|10.47%
|-
| colspan="5" style="background-color:#E9E9E9;"|
|- style="font-weight:bold"
| colspan="3" style="text-align:left;" | Total
| 
| 100%
|-
| colspan="5" style="background-color:#E9E9E9;"|
|- style="font-weight:bold"
| colspan="4" |Source:
|
|}

2003

|-
! colspan=2 style="background-color:#E9E9E9;text-align:left;vertical-align:top;" |Candidate
! style="background-color:#E9E9E9;text-align:left;vertical-align:top;" |Party
! style="background-color:#E9E9E9;text-align:right;" |Votes
! style="background-color:#E9E9E9;text-align:right;" |%
|-
|style="background-color:"|
|align=left|Marat Magdeyev
|align=left|United Russia
|
|67.54%
|-
|style="background-color:"|
|align=left|Vladimir Kazakov
|align=left|Communist Party
|
|5.00%
|-
|style="background-color:"|
|align=left|Fandas Safiullin (incumbent)
|align=left|Rodina
|
|4.68%
|-
|style="background-color:#00A1FF"|
|align=left|Aleksandr Verentsov
|align=left|Party of Russia's Rebirth-Russian Party of Life
|
|4.35%
|-
|style="background-color:#7C73CC"|
|align=left|Sergey Brusov
|align=left|Great Russia – Eurasian Union
|
|4.13%
|-
|style="background-color:#FFD700"|
|align=left|Salimkhan Akhmetkhanov
|align=left|People's Party
|
|2.45%
|-
|style="background-color:"|
|align=left|Khikmatulla Safiullin
|align=left|Independent
|
|1.59%
|-
|style="background-color:"|
|align=left|Rinat Gibadullin
|align=left|Liberal Democratic Party
|
|1.53%
|-
|style="background-color:#000000"|
|colspan=2 |against all
|
|6.93%
|-
| colspan="5" style="background-color:#E9E9E9;"|
|- style="font-weight:bold"
| colspan="3" style="text-align:left;" | Total
| 
| 100%
|-
| colspan="5" style="background-color:#E9E9E9;"|
|- style="font-weight:bold"
| colspan="4" |Source:
|
|}

2016

|-
! colspan=2 style="background-color:#E9E9E9;text-align:left;vertical-align:top;" |Candidate
! style="background-color:#E9E9E9;text-align:leftt;vertical-align:top;" |Party
! style="background-color:#E9E9E9;text-align:right;" |Votes
! style="background-color:#E9E9E9;text-align:right;" |%
|-
| style="background-color: " |
|align=left|Rinat Khayrov
|align=left|United Russia
|
|79.19%
|-
|style="background-color:"|
|align=left|Aleksandr Agafonov
|align=left|Communist Party
|
|7.51%
|-
|style="background-color:"|
|align=left|Valery Aleynikov
|align=left|Liberal Democratic Party
|
|3.24%
|-
|style="background:"| 
|align=left|Eduard Mukhametshin
|align=left|Communists of Russia
|
|2.74%
|-
|style="background-color:"|
|align=left|Zakary Mingazov
|align=left|A Just Russia
|
|2.66%
|-
|style="background-color:"|
|align=left|Marat Kurbanov
|align=left|Yabloko
|
|2.55%
|-
|style="background-color:"|
|align=left|Airat Khanipov
|align=left|Rodina
|
|1.49%
|-
| colspan="5" style="background-color:#E9E9E9;"|
|- style="font-weight:bold"
| colspan="3" style="text-align:left;" | Total
| 
| 100%
|-
| colspan="5" style="background-color:#E9E9E9;"|
|- style="font-weight:bold"
| colspan="4" |Source:
|
|}

2021

|-
! colspan=2 style="background-color:#E9E9E9;text-align:left;vertical-align:top;" |Candidate
! style="background-color:#E9E9E9;text-align:left;vertical-align:top;" |Party
! style="background-color:#E9E9E9;text-align:right;" |Votes
! style="background-color:#E9E9E9;text-align:right;" |%
|-
|style="background-color: " |
|align=left|Azat Yagafarov
|align=left|United Russia
|
|69.77%
|-
|style="background-color:"|
|align=left|Aleksey Semenikhin
|align=left|Communist Party
|
|11.48%
|-
|style="background-color:"|
|align=left|Adel Vakhitov
|align=left|Liberal Democratic Party
|
|3.74%
|-
|style="background-color:"|
|align=left|Renat Galimzyanov
|align=left|Communists of Russia
|
|3.69%
|-
|style="background-color:"|
|align=left|Sergey Sudykin
|align=left|A Just Russia — For Truth
|
|2.97%
|-
|style="background-color: " |
|align=left|Roza Gaynutdinova
|align=left|New People
|
|2.53%
|-
|style="background-color: " |
|align=left|Oleg Buyantsev
|align=left|Party of Growth
|
|1.71%
|-
|style="background-color: " |
|align=left|Andrey Lukin
|align=left|Yabloko
|
|1.65%
|-
|style="background-color: "|
|align=left|Sergey Sitko
|align=left|Party of Pensioners
|
|1.53%
|-
| colspan="5" style="background-color:#E9E9E9;"|
|- style="font-weight:bold"
| colspan="3" style="text-align:left;" | Total
| 
| 100%
|-
| colspan="5" style="background-color:#E9E9E9;"|
|- style="font-weight:bold"
| colspan="4" |Source:
|
|}

Notes

References

Russian legislative constituencies
Politics of Tatarstan